Kenilworth is a rural town and locality in the Sunshine Coast Region, Queensland, Australia.

Geography
Kenilworth is in the heart of the Mary Valley area of the Sunshine Coast.

The western part of the locality is within the Conondale National Park, while the northern part of the locality is within Imbil State Forest #1. In the south-west is the Walli State Forest.

Maleny–Kenilworth Road enters from the south-west, and Obi Obi Road enters from the south-east..

History
Dalla (also known as Dalambara and Dallambara) is a language of the Upper Brisbane River catchment, notably the Conondale Range. Dalla is part of the Duungidjawu language region includes the landscape within the local government boundaries of the Somerset Region and Moreton Bay Region, particularly the towns of Caboolture, Kilcoy, Woodford and Moore.

The Mary River was known to the Aboriginals as the Numabulla and the name for the Kenilworth area being Hinka Booma. In 1842 Andrew Petrie named the river as the Wide Bay River. In 1847 that Governor Fitzroy renamed the river after his wife Mary.

Richard Joseph Smith tendered to set up the first cattle run on the east bank of the Mary River in 1850. At the time Mrs Smith was reading Sir Walter Scott's novel "Kenilworth" and she decided to name the property after the novel.

In 1877,  of land was resumed from the Kenilworth North pastoral run to be used as small farmers. The land was offered for selection from 17 April 1877.

During the second half of the 19th century, the Smiths took up more land.

Up to £30 was paid for a town lot while the dairy blocks fetched up to £18 per acre and grazing blocks up to £7 per acre, realising a total of £46,000 from the sale overall.

Other settlers arrived in 1891 originally intending to grow small crops. There was a ready market at the goldfields in Gympie but after the floods of 1893, 1895 and 1898 had wiped out their crops, most ventured into dairying and pig breeding. In 1901 the Kenilworth Farmers' Association was formed and in 1907 they built the Kenilworth Farmers Assembly Hall. This later housed a library and hosted dances. In 1905 the Association was responsible for establishing a co-operative butter factory which opened in Caboolture in 1907.

Also established was the Kenilworth Farmers' Co-operative Store in Eumundi. In 1912 a steam-powered sawmill was built on Coolabine Creek. In 1921 Kenilworth Station was sold off and divided into dairy farms and allotments. By 1925 all the large estates in the district had been subdivided and sold. Today dairying is still a major part of farming in the area but there has been diversification into fruit and vegetables and pig farming.

Kenilworth Post Office opened by 1926 (a receiving office had been open from 1896).

The first store was opened in Kenilworth on 2 January 1924 as well as the new hall opening and the first butcher's shop appeared in 1925.

Kenilworth Provisional School built by the community opened on 22 January 1900.  On 1 January 1909, it became Kenilworth State School. On 19 September 1928, it was renamed Kenilworth Lower State School. It closed on 3 July 1959. This school was in the area now known as Gheerulla.

Kenilworth Township Provisional School opened 21 October 1924. On 1 October 1926, it became Kenilworth Township State School. On 15 May 1939, it was renamed Kenilworth State School. On 6 March 2003, it became Kenilworth State Community College. On 31 December 2008, the school ceased to provide secondary schooling (previously up to Year 10).

Kenilworth Hall opened in the Kenilworth Township on 21 October 1924. In 1926, the hall was equipped to show silent movies. The site for a public recreation ground was purchased in 1927 and, in 1933, the hall was moved to this new location.

The Church of England Mary Valley Parish was established in 1925.

The Kenilworth Library opened in 1986 with a major refurbishment in 2000.

Heritage listings 
Kenilworth has a number of heritage-listed sites, including:
 Eumundi-Kenilworth Road: Kenilworth Homestead

Education
Kenilworth State Community College is a government primary (Prep-6) school for boys and girls at 3717 Maleny-Kenilworth Road. In 2018, the school had an enrolment of 59 students with 9 teachers (5 full-time equivalent) and 9 non-teaching staff (5 full-time equivalent). It includes a special education program.

There is no secondary school in Kenilworth. The nearest government secondary schools are Mary Valley State College (to Year 10) in neighbouring Imbil to the north and Maleny State High School (to Year 12) in Maleny to the south-east.

Amenities
The Sunshine Coast Regional Council operates a public library at 4A Elizabeth Street.

Attractions 
Kenilworth has a 'Living History' Museum with a theatrette which shows a history of the district to visitors, together with displays covering many areas of history past.

Kenilworth Homestead still exists, though the 10,000 hectare cattle station is now reduced to 50 hectares. Since 1875, the Homestead and out-buildings have continually been restored and extended, still keeping as much of its original structure as possible. It is now used as a camping and riding centre.

Other attractions include a cheese factory as well as walking, camping and 4-wheel driving in the Kenilworth State Forest.

References

External links

Aerial and other video of Kenilworth and the Mary River Valley
 University of Queensland: Queensland Places: Kenilworth
Kenilworth Town Website – Includes visitor and other information for the upper Mary Valley region.

Suburbs of the Sunshine Coast Region
Towns in Queensland
Localities in Queensland